Sakovich, Sakovič, or Sakowicz is a surname of Polish or Belarusian origin with variants in a number of other languages. 

Notable people with this surname include:

 Kazimierz Sakowicz (1899-1944), Polish journalist
 Jon Sakovich (born 1970), American swimmer
 Nancy Anne Sakovich (born 1961), Canadian actress and model

Belarusian-language surnames